Thomas Cannon may refer to:

 Tom Cannon (wrestler) (born 1852), British wrestler
 Tom Cannon Sr. (1846–1917), British flat racing jockey and trainer
 Thomas Cannon (author), 18th-century British author
 Thomas Cannon (philanthropist) (1925–2005), American philanthropist
 Tommy Cannon (born 1938), British comedian
 Tom Cannon (born 2002), Irish footballer